Hilaria del Rosario de Aguinaldo (born Hilaria del Rosario y Reyes; 17 February 1877 – 6 March 1921) was the first wife of General Emilio Aguinaldo, the first President of the Philippines.

Life
Hilaria del Rosario y Reyes was born on February 17, 1877, in Tinabunan (now Pag-asa) in Imus, Cavite to Guillermo del Rosario y Bautista and Cristina Reyes y Flores. She was baptized four days later by Andrés Galdeano at Imus Church.

Emilio Aguinaldo married her on New Year's Day, 1896–the very same day he joined the Katipunan, the secret society that would initiate the Philippine Revolution that year. Although the title "First Lady" (Spanish: Primera Dama) was not used, and did not refer to the wife of the President of the Philippines (being used only with the onset of the American governors-general in reference to their wives) at the time, she is today considered the first First Lady of the Philippines.

She complemented Emilio's military campaigns by caring for wounded soldiers and their families. In 1899, as the president's consort, she established the Hijas de la Revolución (Daughters of the Revolution) that later became Asociación de la Cruz Roja (Red Cross Association). 

The organisation is considered a precursor of the present Philippine National Red Cross, and for this she raised funds for medicines and other medical supplies. She was captured by American troops in 1900 and reunited with her husband after his capture by the Americans in 1901.

Death
Hilaria del Rosario de Aguinaldo died on March 6, 1921, aged 44, from pulmonary tuberculosis. She was buried the next day.

In popular culture
 Portrayed by Cristine Reyes in the 2012 film, El Presidente.
 Portrayed by Che Ramos in the 2018 film, Goyo: Ang Batang Heneral.

References

1877 births
1921 deaths
Hilaria
Filipino Resistance activists
Filipino Roman Catholics
People of the Philippine Revolution
First Ladies and First Gentlemen of the Philippines
People from Kawit, Cavite
Spouses of presidents of the Philippines
20th-century deaths from tuberculosis
Tuberculosis deaths in the Philippines